"Good Luck Charm" is the second single from Jagged Edge's self-titled fifth album Jagged Edge. It was certified gold by the (RIAA).

Charts

Weekly charts

Year-end charts

References

2006 singles
Jagged Edge (American group) songs
Song recordings produced by Jermaine Dupri
2006 songs